Mkoani is a town located on the Tanzanian island of Pemba. It is the capital of Pemba South region, as well as Mkoani District. Mkoani now has the busiest harbour on Pemba island, most ferries from Zanzibar or the mainland arrive at Mkoani.

The Abdulla Mzee hospital is in Mkoani.

Climate
Mkoani has a tropical climate, milder than Tanzania's mainland and milder than in Unguja island. This climate is classified as "Am" by the Köppen-Geiger system. The average temperature in Mkoani is 26 °C (79 °F). The average annual rainfall is 1,924 mm. The monthly average temperatures are usually between 24 - 28 °C (75 °F - 82 °F). There are two rain seasons, with most rainfall coming between March and June and smaller rain season coming between November and December. Drier months are January - February, and a longer drier season between July to October.

Notes

Cities in Zanzibar
Regional capitals in Tanzania
Pemba Island
Pemba South Region